The Airsport Sonet is a Czech ultralight aircraft, designed and produced by Airsport of Zbraslavice. The aircraft is supplied in complete, ready-to-fly form.

Design and development
The aircraft was derived from the Airsport Sonata motor glider and designed to comply with the Fédération Aéronautique Internationale microlight rules. It features a cantilever low-wing, a T-tail, a two-seats-in-side-by-side configuration enclosed cockpit, fixed tricycle landing gear and a single engine in tractor configuration.

The Sonet is made from composites. Standard engines available are the  Rotax 582 two-stroke and the  HKS 700E four-stroke powerplant.

Specifications (Sonet 11.4)

References

External links

2000s Czech ultralight aircraft
Single-engined tractor aircraft
Airsport aircraft